Marysville is a city in Marion County, Iowa, United States. The population was 44 at the time of the 2020 census.

Geography
Marysville is located at  (41.181133, -92.952301).
This location is on the north bank of Cedar Creek, 15 miles southeast of Knoxville, the county seat of Marion County.

History

There are numerous coal exposures on the banks of the branches of Cedar Creek both north and south of Marysville.  In 1846, one exposure south of Marysville was found to be on fire, and this fire continued until June 1851, when heavy rains and flooding extinguished the fire.

The county surveyor, Joseph Brobst, filed a plat for Marysville on March 4, 1851, creating 26 lots and a public square that was later subdivided into additional lots.  Marysville was named after the 5 members of the Brobst family who were named Mary.  Originally, the Marysville post office was named Ely or Ely's.  A Methodist church was established in 1867, a weekly newspaper, the Marysville Miner, was established in 1871, and a woolen factory was opened in 1872.  Marysville was officially incorporated as a town in the late 1870s, and by 1910, it had three general stores, a post office, a 4-teacher public school, and telephone service.

A five-foot bed of coal was exposed along North Cedar Creek about 2 miles north of Marysville, and by 1867, several coal banks were open in the Marysville area and Jacob Kline had opened a mine about a mile north of Marysville, where the coal was 10 feet thick.  By 1908, eleven different mines had been worked in the Marysville area, primarily by the Mammoth Vein Coal Company, which took over from the O.K. Coal Company in 1903.  The Wabash Railroad built a 7-mile spur line to serve the mines.

Everist
The coal camp of Everist, Iowa was located about 2 miles north of Marysville near .  The camp post office operated from 1905 to 1918.  Everist served mines operated by the Mammoth Vein Coal Company and later the Empire Coal Company.  Employment in 1914 was seasonal, varying from 90 to 300 men, and the mines at Everist shipped up to 800 carloads of coal per day circa 1914.  The nearest railroad station was 6 miles away (by road) in Bussey.  As is typical of coal camps, the coal company owned the houses in Everist and met the residents' needs through a company store.  Scrip tokens for The Everist Mercantile Co. are occasionally found on the collectors' market.   United Mine Workers local 981 was organized in Everist in 1905; by 1907, it had 480 members.  Mine wages varied from $1.13 to $2.56 per day.

Demographics

2010 census
As of the census of 2010, there were 66 people, 23 households, and 21 families residing in the city. The racial makeup of the city was 93.9% White and 6.1% from two or more races.

There were 23 households, of which 39.1% had children under the age of 18 living with them, 82.6% were married couples living together, 8.7% had a female householder with no husband present, and 8.7% were non-families. 8.7% of all households were made up of individuals, and 4.3% had someone living alone who was 65 years of age or older. The average household size was 2.87 and the average family size was 3.05.

The median age in the city was 37.3 years. 30.3% of residents were under the age of 18; 6.1% were between the ages of 18 and 24; 28.7% were from 25 to 44; 24.2% were from 45 to 64; and 10.6% were 65 years of age or older. The gender makeup of the city was 51.5% male and 48.5% female.

2000 census
As of the census of 2000, there were 54 people, 21 households, and 17 families residing in the city. The racial makeup of the city was 94.44% White, and 5.56% from two or more races.

There were 21 households, out of which 33.3% had children under the age of 18 living with them, 61.9% were married couples living together, 4.8% had a female householder with no husband present, and 19.0% were non-families. 19.0% of all households were made up of individuals, and 9.5% had someone living alone who was 65 years of age or older. The average household size was 2.57 and the average family size was 2.82.

In the city, the population was spread out, with 27.8% under the age of 18, 7.4% from 18 to 24, 31.5% from 25 to 44, 27.8% from 45 to 64, and 5.6% who were 65 years of age or older. The median age was 36 years. For every 100 females, there were 134.8 males. For every 100 females age 18 and over, there were 129.4 males.

The median income for a household in the city was $43,750, and the median income for a family was $53,750. Males had a median income of $34,375 versus $29,375 for females. The per capita income for the city was $17,135. None of the population and none of the families were below the poverty line.

Education
The Twin Cedars Community School District operates local public schools.

References

Cities in Iowa
Cities in Marion County, Iowa